The House of Tolstoy, or Tolstoi, is a family of Russian gentry that acceded to the high aristocracy of the Russian Empire. The name Tolstoy (Russian "Толстой") is itself derived from the Russian adjective "толстый" ("thick, stout, fat"). They are the descendants of Andrey Kharitonovich Tolstoy ("the Fat"), who moved from Chernigov to Moscow and served under Vasily II of Moscow in the 15th century. The "wild Tolstoys", as they were known in the high society of Imperial Russia, have left a lasting legacy in Russian politics, military history, literature, and fine arts.

Origins
The Tolstoys were a family of provincial Muscovite gentry who claimed their ancestry to a mythical Lithuanian nobleman named Indris stated by Pyotr Tolstoy as supposedly having arrived from the Holy Roman Empire to Chernigov in 1353, the very year when the city became part of Grand Duchy of Lithuania, together with his two sons Litvinos (or Litvonis, "Lithuanian") and Zimonten (or Zigmont, or "Samogitian") and a druzhina of 3000 men. Litvonis and Zimonten possibly refer to the two main parts of Lithuania at the time - Samogitia was considered administratively separate from Lithuania Proper (in the narrow sense) for much of history. Indris was then  supposedly converted to Eastern Orthodoxy as Leonty and his sons — as Konstantin and Feodor, respectively; adopting religion of the locals was typical of Lithuanian nobility at the time and characteristic of the Lithuanian style of governing. Konstantin's grandson, Andrei Kharitonovich, was nicknamed Tolstiy (translated as fat) by Vasily II of Moscow after he moved from Chernigov to Moscow.

Because of the pagan names and the fact that Chernigov at the time was ruled by Demetrius I Starshy some research concluded that they were Lithuanians who arrived from the Grand Duchy of Lithuania, then in conflict with the State of the Teutonic Order. At the same time, no mention of Indris was ever found in the 14-16th century documents, while the Chernigov Chronicles used by Pyotr Tolstoy as a reference were lost. The first documented members of the Tolstoy family also lived in the 17th century. Pyotr Tolstoy is the founder of the titled branch of the family; he was granted the title of count by Peter the Great. The untitled branch of the same stem is descended from Ivan Andreevich Tolstoy. Their common ancestor was Andrey Vasilievich Tolstoy, who married Stepanida Andreevna Miloslavskaya, a cousin of the tsarina. This marriage had allowed the average gentry family to enter the Moscow court. The Tolstoy family is also found amongst untitled provincial gentry of the same origins.

In the Napoleonic wars

Two members of the family were active during the Napoleonic wars. Count Pyotr Aleksandrovich Tolstoy (1761–1844) served under Suvorov in wars against Poland and the Ottoman Empire, was made a general-adjutant in 1797, went as an ambassador to Paris in 1807 and tried to persuade Alexander I to prepare for the war against France, without much success though. He served as the governor of St Petersburg and Kronstadt from 1828 until his death.

Alexander Ivanovich Tolstoy (1770–1857), stemming from a collateral branch of the family, inherited the comital title and estates of his childless uncle, the last of the Ostermanns.

He first distinguished himself in the Battle of Czarnowo on the night and following morning of 23–24 December 1806, where under his command the 2nd Division of the Russian Army in Poland held out for fifteen hours against the whole army commanded by Napoleon. One of the most admired generals of the anti-Napoleonic coalition, he was rewarded for his courage in the battles at Pultusk and Eylau. At Guttstadt he was wounded so seriously that they feared for his life. In the great battle of Borodino he brilliantly commanded the key positions until he was shell-shocked and taken away from the battlefield. Ostermann-Tolstoy was once again wounded in the battle of Bautzen (1813) but did not give up command of his force. His crowning achievement was the victory at Kulm (August 30, 1813), which cost him amputation of the left arm. When the war was over, he quarreled with the Emperor, resigned and spent the rest of his life in Europe.

In high society
Count Feodor Petrovich Tolstoy (1783–1873), sympathetically mentioned by Pushkin in Eugene Onegin, was one of the most fashionable Russian drawers and painters of the 1820s. Although he prepared fine illustrations for Bogdanovich's Dushenka, his genuine vocation was wax modeling and the design of medals. As he gradually went blind he had to give up drawing and started writing ballets and librettos for operas. He was appointed Vice-President of the Academy of Arts in 1828. Many of his works may be seen in the Russian Museum, St Petersburg.

Count Fyodor Ivanovich Tolstoy (1782–1846) was a notorious drunkard, gastronome, and duellist. It is said that he killed 11 people in duels. In 1803 he participated in the first Russian circumnavigation of the Earth. After he had his body tattooed at the Marquesas and debauched all the crew, captain Krusenstern had to maroon him on the Aleutian Islands near Kamchatka. When he returned to St Petersburg, Count Fedor was nicknamed Amerikanets ("the American"). He fought bravely in the Patriotic War of 1812 but scandalized his family again by marrying a Gypsy singer in 1821. Alexander Griboyedov satirized him in Woe from Wit, and his cousin Leo Tolstoy — who called him an "extraordinary, criminal, and attractive man" — fictionalized him as Dolokhov in War and Peace.

In Russian literature
Many of the Tolstoys devoted their spare time to literary pursuits. For instance, Count Alexei Konstantinovich (1817–75) was a courtier but also one of the most popular Russian poets of his time. He wrote admirable ballads, a historical novel, some licentious verse, and satires published under the penname of Kozma Prutkov. His lasting contribution to the Russian literature was a trilogy of historical dramas, modelled after Pushkin's Boris Godunov.

Count Lev Nikolaevich (1828–1910), more widely known abroad as Leo Tolstoy, is acclaimed as one of the greatest novelists of all time. After he started his career in the military, he was first drawn to writing books when he served in Chechenya, and already his first story, Detstvo ("Childhood"), was something quite unlike anything written before him. It was in his family estate Yasnaya Polyana near Tula that he created two novels, War and Peace and Anna Karenina, that are widely acclaimed as among the best novels ever written. Later he developed a kind of non-traditional Christian philosophy, described in his work The Kingdom of God is Within You which inspired Rainer Maria Rilke and Mohandas Gandhi, then a young lawyer, whose influence extended to Martin Luther King Jr. and James Bevel.

Of Lev's thirteen children, most spent their life either promoting his teachings or denouncing them. His youngest daughter and secretary, Alexandra Lvovna (1884–1979), had a particularly troubled life. Although she shared with her father the doctrine of nonviolence, she felt it was her duty to take part in the events of World War I.

Count Aleksey Nikolayevich Tolstoy (1883–1945) belonged to a different branch of the family. His early short stories, published in 1910s, were panned by critics for excessive naturalism and wanton eroticism. After the Revolution he briefly emigrated to Germany, but then changed his political views and returned to the Soviet Union. His science fiction novels Aelita (1923), about a journey to Mars, and The Garin Death Ray (1927) are still popular with readers. In his later years he published two lengthy novels on historical subjects, Peter the First (1929–45) and The Road to Calvary (1922-41). As a staunch supporter of Joseph Stalin, he became known as "Red Count" or "Comrade Count" and his works were acknowledged as classics of Soviet literature. Most of his reputation declined with that of Socialist Realism, but his children's tale character Buratino retains his strong legacy with the younger audience of Russia and across the former Soviet space, appearing as popular reading, a movie, and a variety of derivative forms.

His granddaughter Tatyana Tolstaya (born May 3, 1951) is one of the foremost Russian short story writers. Another member of the family is Count Nikolai Tolstoy-Miloslavsky (born in 1935), a British historian and monarchist, and nominal head of the House of Tolstoy today.

After the Russian revolution
Some of the members of the Tolstoy family left Russia in the aftermath of the Russian Revolution and the subsequent establishment of the Soviet Union, and many of the Leo Tolstoy's relatives and descendants today live in Sweden, Germany, the United Kingdom, France and the United States. Among them are Swedish jazz singer Viktoria Tolstoy. Leo Tolstoy's last surviving grandchild, Countess Tatiana Tolstoy-Paus, died in 2007 at Herresta manor in Sweden, which is owned by Leo Tolstoy's descendants in the Paus family. Two of Leo Tolstoy's great-great-grandsons are Pyotr Tolstoy, a Russian TV presenter and State Duma deputy since 2016 and Vladimir Tolstoy, journalist and adviser to the President of Russia on culture.

Notable people

Selivestr Ivanovich Tolstoy (? –1612),
Grigory Ivanovich Tolstoy (? –1636),
Vasili Ivanovich Tolstoy (? –1649),
Andrey Vasiliyevich Tolstoy (? –1690),
Ivan Andreyevich Tolstoy (1644–1713),
Pyotr Andreyevich Tolstoy (1645–1729),
Matvei Andreyevich Tolstoy (? –1763),
Ivan Matveyevich Tolstoy (1746–1808),
Dmitry Aleksandrovich Tolstoy (1754–1832), governor of Mogilev
Fyodor Andreyevich Tolstoy (1758–1849), bibliophile and collector
Nikolai Aleksandrovich Tolstoy (1761–1816), grand master of court ceremonies
Pyotr Aleksandrovich Tolstoy (1769–1844), military commander and diplomat
Aleksander Ivanovich Ostermann-Tolstoy (1770–1857), full general of infantry
Matvei Feodorovich Tolstoy (1772–1815), senator
Fyodor Petrovich Tolstoy (1783–1873), artist
Fyodor Ivanovich Tolstoy (The American) (1782–1846), adventurer
Pavel Matveyevich Golenischev-Kutuzov-Tolstoy (1800–1883), grandson and heir of Mikhail Illarionovich Kutuzov
Yegor Petrovich Tolstoy (1802–1874), lieutenant-general, governor of Taganrog and Kaluga, senator
Nikolai Matveyevich Tolstoy (1802–1879), full general of infantry, grandfather of Anna Vyrubova
Ivan Matveyevich Tolstoy (1806–1867), grand master of court ceremonies and minister of post service
Feofil Matveyevich Tolstoy (1809–1881), music critic and composer
Mikhail Vladimirovich Tolstoy (1812–1896), writer
Aleksey Konstantinovich Tolstoy (1817–1875), poet
Dmitry Andreyevich Tolstoy (1823–1889), statesman
Yuri Vasiliyevich Tolstoy (1824–1878), statesman and historian
Leo (Lev) Nikolayevich Tolstoy (1828–1910), writer and philosopher
Sophia Andreyevna Tolstaya (1844–1919), Leo Tolstoy's wife
Tatyana Sukhotina-Tolstaya (1864–1950), Leo Tolstoy's oldest daughter
Ilya Tolstoy (1866–1933), son of Leo Tolstoy, writer and memoirist
Nicholas Tolstoy (1867–1938), Russian Catholic priest and theologian.
Lev Lvovich Tolstoy (1871–1945), son of Leo Tolstoy, sculptor
Ivan Ivanovich Tolstoy (1880–1954), philologist and academician
Aleksey Nikolayevich Tolstoy (1883–1945), writer
Alexandra Lvovna Tolstaya (1884–1979), philanthropist
Tatiana Tolstoy-Paus (1914–2007), Swedish socialite and politician
Irina Aleksandrovna (1917–1998), stepdaughter of Duke Georg of Mecklemburg, wife of Prince Franz Ferdinand of Isenburg,grandmother of Princess Sophie ( wife of Prince Georg Friedrich of Prussia, current head of House of Hohenzollern) and Archduchess Katharina (wife of Archduke Martin of Austria Este)
Nikita Ilyich Tolstoy (1923–1996), philologist
Nikolai Tolstoy (b. 1935), historian
Tatyana Nikitishna Tolstaya (1951), granddaughter of Aleksey Nikolayevich Tolstoy, writer
Artemy Lebedev (b. 1975), Russian designer and top blogger, son of Tatyana Tolstaya
Vladimir Tolstoy (b. 1962), Leo Tolstoy's great-great-grandson, director of the Yasnaya Polyana museum
Pyotr Tolstoy (b. 1969), Leo Tolstoy's great-great-grandson, Russian journalist, TV presenter and politician
Fyokla Tolstaya (b. 1971), Leo Tolstoy's great-great-granddaughter, Russian journalist and TV presenter
Svetlana Tolstaya (b. 1971), race walker
Viktoria Tolstoy (b. 1974, née Kjellberg), Swedish jazz singer
Alexandra Tolstoy (b. 1974), equine adventurer, author
Xenia Tolstoy (b. 1980), jewellery designer
Lis Tolstoy (b. 1971), professional land surveyor

Places
Several places in Russia are named to commemorate Leo Tolstoy, e.g., Tolstoy-Yurt, village in Chechnya.

Quotes
"It's so wonderful to be a Tolstoy" (Countess Tatiana Tolstoy-Paus, Leo Tolstoy's last surviving grandchild)

References

External links
Official site of Leo Tolstoy's family and museum
Official site of the Tolstoy Studies Journal
Tolstoy's Legacy for Mankind: A Manifesto for Nonviolence, Part 1
Tolstoy's Legacy for Mankind: A Manifesto for Nonviolence, Part 2
Russian Army during the Napoleonic Wars
Audio files

 
Russian commanders of the Napoleonic Wars
Tolstoy